Ennen aamunkoittoo is the fourth studio album by Finnish reggae artist Raappana. Released on 9 October 2015, the album peaked at number 36 on the Finnish Albums Chart.

Track listing

Charts

Release history

References

2015 albums
Raappana (musician) albums